St. Gregory's University was a private Catholic university. It was one of the oldest institutions of higher learning in the U.S. state of Oklahoma. It had its main campus in Shawnee and an additional campus in Tulsa. The university closed its operations at the end of the fall 2017 semester.

In December 2018 the sale of the Shawnee campus to Hobby Lobby was approved by the bankruptcy court. The campus was leased to Oklahoma Baptist University (OBU), a private Christian university in Shawnee.  In May 2019, OBU renamed the tract as the OBU Green Campus, both in honor of the Green family, owners of Hobby Lobby, and because the color green is one of OBU’s official university colors. In December 2019, Hobby Lobby and the Green family donated the campus to OBU. OBU also retains academic records from St. Gregory's, including student transcripts.

History
St. Gregory's traced its roots to the Sacred Heart Mission, founded in Atoka, Oklahoma on October 12, 1875 by the Benedictine monks Father Isidore Robot, O.S.B., and Brother Dominic Lambert, O.S.B. In 1876, the mission relocated near Konawa, Oklahoma and became an abbey. Sacred Heart College was founded with the permission of the Vatican in 1877 and later gained approval from the territorial government in 1883.  After a disastrous fire in 1901 that destroyed the school and the monastery, the monks accepted an offer from the town of Shawnee and began construction of the Catholic University of Oklahoma and St. Gregory's Abbey in 1910. The school opened its doors in 1915, and in 1922 the name was changed to St. Gregory's College. The monks jointly operated a high school for boys at the location until 1965. In 1927, the abbey moved from Konawa to Shawnee. The school was known as St. Gregory's College until 1997, when it changed from a junior college to a baccalaureate-conferring university known as St. Gregory's University. In 2005 St. Gregory's was accredited to offer a graduate program in business and began offering classes in March 2006.

2011 earthquake

On November 5, 2011, a 5.8 magnitude earthquake caused damage to Benedictine Hall, the campus's central feature.  One turret collapsed immediately following the quake. In the days that followed the earthquake, one of the turrets had to be pushed down, and the other two were removed brick by brick.

More than 3,400 donors from around the world contributed roughly $2.5 million to help the school reconstruct the turrets.

Timberlake Construction and Advanced Masonry, both of Oklahoma City, were charged with the task of rebuilding the turrets – this time with steel "bones" that could withstand an earthquake.

The decorative aspects of the towers were faithfully recreated. The brick was matched to the rest of the building, and the grotesques and shields that were part of the original gothic architecture were molded in the exact image of their predecessors. The new turrets were officially blessed during Homecoming on November 9, 2013.

Closure
The board of directors voted to close the university at the end of the 2017 fall semester following an unsuccessful loan application to the U.S. Department of Agriculture. The loan, around 1 million dollars, would have kept the university open for one more semester.

Enrollment
St. Gregory's University served 692 students in two colleges – the College of Arts and Sciences and the College of Continuing Studies (formerly the College for Working Adults).  Students in the College of Arts and Sciences were provided with a solid foundation in the liberal arts through a common core curriculum, the heart of which was the four-semester "Tradition and Conversation" program, which offered students the opportunity to engage some of the greatest minds and discuss some of most influential texts of the Western and Catholic intellectual traditions in a seminar format.  The College of Continuing Studies was located in two cities – Shawnee and Tulsa – and offered accelerated, evening degree programs at the associates, bachelors and masters levels. St. Gregory's had a student/faculty ratio of 12:1.

Campus

Other small parcels have been sold off. The abbey remains open.

St. Gregory’s Abbey and College is on the National Register of Historic Places listings in Pottawatomie County, Oklahoma.

Mabee-Gerrer Museum of Art

The Mabee-Gerrer Museum of Art is an independent non-profit art museum. While located on the former campus of St. Gregory's, it operated separately and survived the University's closing. Its collection includes ancient Egyptian, medieval, Renaissance, and Hudson River School art. The museum was founded in 1914 by Rev. Gregory Gerrer, OSB. In 1919 the museum was located in Benedictine Hall. The current museum building opened in 1979.

Athletics
The St. Gregory's (SGU) athletic teams were called the Cavaliers. The university was a member of the National Association of Intercollegiate Athletics (NAIA), primarily competing in the Sooner Athletic Conference (SAC) from 1999–2000 to 2016–17.

SGU competed in 16 intercollegiate varsity sports: Men's sports included baseball, basketball, cross country, golf, soccer, swimming & diving and track & field; while women's sports included basketball, cross country, golf, soccer, softball, swimming & diving, track & field and volleyball. Co-ed competitive cheerleading was also offered.

Discontinuation
However, once the decision to suspend operation of the university was reached, all athletics programs were suspended immediately.

Notable alumni
 Denise Bode
 Doug Combs
 Mikhael Jaimez-Ruiz
 Stephen Aloysius Leven

References

External links
 
 Official athletics website 

 
Christianity in Tulsa, Oklahoma
Education in Pottawatomie County, Oklahoma
OK Cooperative Alliance
Defunct private universities and colleges in Oklahoma
Catholic universities and colleges in Oklahoma
Educational institutions established in 1875
Benedictine colleges and universities
Buildings and structures in Pottawatomie County, Oklahoma
Defunct universities and colleges in Tulsa, Oklahoma
Buildings and structures in Tulsa, Oklahoma
1875 establishments in Indian Territory
Roman Catholic Archdiocese of Oklahoma City
Educational institutions disestablished in 2017
2017 disestablishments in Oklahoma